The Canadian Society of Hospital Pharmacists (CSHP) is a professional organization representing the interests of pharmacists who practice in hospitals and related healthcare settings. It publishes the Canadian Journal of Hospital Pharmacy. The CSHP has more than 3,000 hospital pharmacists as members.

References

Pharmacy organizations in Canada
Pharmacy-related professional associations
Organizations established in 1950
1950 establishments in Canada